Allendale Public Schools (APS) is a school district headquartered in Allendale, Michigan.

Schools
 Allendale High School
 Allendale Middle School
 Oakwood Intermediate School
 Allendale Elementary School Building
 Evergreen Wing or Evergreen Elementary School
 Springview Wing or Springview Elementary School

Optional:
 New Options High School

References

External links
 Allendale Public Schools

Allendale, Michigan
Education in Ottawa County, Michigan
School districts in Michigan